Douglas McDonald may refer to:

 Douglas McDonald (rower), Canadian rowing athlete
 Dougie McDonald, Scottish football referee
 Douglas McDonald (powerlifter), American Paralympic powerlifter, see Powerlifting at the 1988 Summer Paralympics

See also
Douglas MacDonald, Canadian miner and politician
Doug MacDonald, Canadian ice hockey player